Birgit Zotz (born 7 August 1979) is an Austrian writer, cultural anthropologist and an expert on the subject of hospitality management studies.

Life 
Born in Waidhofen an der Thaya, Lower Austria, Zotz grew up in the Waldviertel and in Vienna. From 1993–1997 she attended the Franz Schubert Konservatorium in Vienna, where she studied saxophone. She got a master's degree in tourism studies from Johannes Kepler University of Linz in 2008 and later obtained a master's degree in ethnology from Vienna University under Manfred Kremser. She is married to Volker Zotz, an eminent Austrian philosopher, and a prolific author in the German language.

Career 
Birgit Zotz has published books, essays and articles about Buddhist culture, mysticism and image-building in tourism. She is a lecturer at the International College of Tourism and Management in Bad Vöslau. Since 2005 she has been President of Komyoji, an internationally recognized center for the study of Buddhism in Austria. She is a researcher on the philosophy and life of Lama Anagarika Govinda, whose biography she wrote.

Books 
 Das Image des Waldviertels als Urlaubsregion. Vienna University of Economics and Business 2006 
 Das Image Tibets als Reiseziel im Spiegel deutschsprachiger Medien. Linz: Kepler University 2008 
 Das Waldviertel – Zwischen Mystik und Klarheit. Das Image einer Region als Reiseziel. Berlin: Köster 2010, 
 Destination Tibet. Touristisches Image zwischen Politik und Klischee. Hamburg: Kovac 2010, 
 Zur europäischen Wahrnehmung von Besessenheitsphänomenen und Orakelwesen in Tibet Vienna University 2010 .

References

Sources 
 Lexikon des Waldviertels, Birgit Zotz 
 International College of Tourism and Management, Faculty 
 Lebenslauf von Birgit Zotz 
 Birgit Zotz, Tibetische Mystik, – nach Lama Anagarika Govinda

External links 
 
 Komyoji
 

1979 births
Living people
Austrian anthropologists
Austrian women anthropologists
21st-century Austrian women writers
Tibetan Buddhism writers
Hospitality management
Tourism researchers